The Drop That Contained the Sea is a classical crossover album by Christopher Tin released in 2014.  It premiered on April 13, 2014 at Carnegie Hall and debuted at #1 on the Billboard Traditional Classical Albums chart on May 24.

The album consists of 10 commissioned works based on the theme of water, each sung in a different language.
All tracks are composed and conducted by Christopher Tin and performed by the Royal Philharmonic Orchestra. The Angel City Chorale performed for many of the tracks.

Track listing

Charts

References

External links 
 Interview with Tin on Minnesota Public Radio
 Interview with Tin on PRI's The World

2014 albums
Concept albums
Royal Philharmonic Orchestra albums